Walieldin Khedr Safour Daiyeen (born 15 September 1995) is a Sudanese professional footballer who plays as a midfielder for Al-Hilal Omdurman and the Sudan national football team.

International goals

References 

1995 births
Living people
Sudanese footballers
Sudan international footballers
Association football midfielders
Al-Ahly Shendi players
Al-Hilal Club (Omdurman) players
2021 Africa Cup of Nations players
2022 African Nations Championship players
Sudan A' international footballers